is a Japanese former voice actress. She has contributed to more than twenty films and television series since 1974 until 1990.

Selected filmography

References

External links 

1952 births
Living people
Japanese voice actresses
People from Hiroshima Prefecture